Leonardo Antonio Aguilar Álvarez Alcalá (born August 15, 1999), known simply as Leonardo Aguilar is a Mexican singer. As of 2017, Aguilar has been nominated for two Latin Grammy Awards.

Early life
Leonardo Aguilar was born to Pepe Aguilar and Aneliz Álvarez Alcalá in Mexico City, Mexico on August 15, 1999. 

Aguilar holds dual citizenship with Mexico and the United States, through his father, who was born in San Antonio, Texas. Aguilar was born into a musical family, known as "La Dinastía Aguilar" (The Aguilar Dynasty). Aguilar's father is Mexican singer Pepe Aguilar, his paternal grandparents are Mexican singer-actors Antonio Aguilar and Flor Silvestre. Since a young age, Aguilar has frequently accompanied his father on tour throughout Latin America with his younger sister, Ángela Aguilar, who also performs.

Career
In 2012, at just twelve years old, Aguilar released Nueva Tradición, alongside his sister, Ángela Aguilar. It featured four songs by Leonardo and four by Ángela.

On December 2, 2016, Aguilar released his first solo album, Gallo Fino, produced by his father, Pepe. Aguilar worked with other prominent Mexican artists such as Espinoza Paz and El Chapo de Sinaloa. Gallo Fino was nominated for Best Norteño Album at the 18th Annual Latin Grammy Awards in 2017. His song "Compromiso Descartado" was also nominated for Best Regional Mexican Song.

Discography
Nueva Tradición (2012)
Gallo Fino (2016)
Y lo Volví a Hacer (2023)

References

1999 births
Living people
Mexican male singer-songwriters
Mexican singer-songwriters
Singers from Mexico City
21st-century Mexican singers
21st-century Mexican male singers